Sherif Hazem (born July 7, 1989) is an Egyptian international football (soccer) player who plays as a center back. He currently plays for Misr Lel-Makkasa SC and has made over 150 appearances in the Egyptian Premier League.

Club career
In 2008, he signed with Egyptian side Asyut Petroleum. In 2009, he moved to ENPPI, and in 2010 he signed for Petrojet. Rated as one of the best centre-backs in Egypt, the two Egyptian giants Al-Ahly and Zamalek SC have both admitted seeking his signature but were beaten to it by Smouha. After moving to Assyriska FF for a month, he terminated his contract and finally signed a big deal with Al-Ahly in August 2014.

He won the Egyptian Premier League, the Egypt Cup and the Egyptian Super Cup two times. He also won the continental CAF Confederation Cup.

He moved to Al Wehda in the Saudi Professional League on a six-month loan for 6.5 million Egyptian Pounds (approximately $400,000) and was selected in the Saudi Arabian league's team of the month twice.

International career
Despite being called up for international duty several times, Hazem was regularly on the bench and has two full caps for Egypt. On 17 January 2011 he made his debut for the Egypt national football team in 2011 Nile Basin Tournament match against Uganda national football team.

References

External links
 

1989 births
Living people
Al Ahly SC players
Petrojet SC players
Al-Wehda Club (Mecca) players
Egyptian footballers
Egypt international footballers
Egyptian expatriate footballers
Expatriate footballers in Sweden
Association football defenders
Saudi Professional League players
Expatriate footballers in Saudi Arabia
Egyptian Premier League players